On Our Own may refer to:

Television and film
 On Our Own (1977 TV series), an American sitcom starring Bess Armstrong and Lynnie Greene
 On Our Own (1994 TV series), an American sitcom starring Ralph Louis Harris
 On Our Own (film), a 1988 American film starring Sam Hennings

Music
 "On Our Own" (Bobby Brown song), 1989
 "On Our Own" (Lime Cordiale song), 2020

See also
 On My Own (disambiguation)
 On Your Own (disambiguation)